Robert Griffith is a former American football player.

Robert Griffith may also refer to:

Robert Griffith (MP) (1501/02–1568), MP for Salisbury
Robert Griffith (MP for Caernarvon Boroughs), in 1593, MP for Caernarvon Boroughs (UK Parliament constituency)
Robert Griffith (historian) (1940–2011), American historian
Bob Griffith (1912–1977), baseball player
Robert E. Griffith (died 1961), producer

See also
Robert Griffiths (disambiguation)